The Inaugural Screen Actors Guild Awards aired on NBC from Stage 12 at Universal Studios Hollywood, on February 25, 1995. Unveiled during this evening for the first time was the Guild's new award statuette, The Actor, as well as the first awards for ensembles in drama series and comedy series which honor all of the actors who are the regulars in television series. From this auspicious beginning the Screen Actors Guild Awards has been embraced as one of the most prestigious in the entertainment industry.

Winners and nominees
Winners are listed first and highlighted in boldface.

Screen Actors Guild Life Achievement Award
 George Burns

Film

Television

References

External links
 The Inaugural Screen Actors Guild Awards
 1st Screen Actors Guild Awards

 1994
1994 film awards
1994 television awards
1994 in American television
1994 in California
1994 in American cinema
February 1995 events in the United States